The  is a judo kata that can be considered as a complement to Mifune Kyūzō's Nage-waza ura-no-kata, but that instead focuses on counter-attacks to controlling techniques rather than throwing techniques. It was compiled by Itō Kazuo from techniques developed by other Japanese newaza experts, and is not an officially recognized Kodokan kata.

Video of Katame-waza ura-no-kata

References

Judo kata